Limnophila schranki is a cranefly in the family Limoniidae.

It is a Palearctic species with a limited distribution in Europe. 

It is found in a wide range of habitats and micro habitats: in earth rich in humus, in swamps and marshes, along streams, in leaf litter and in wet spots in woods.

References

External links 
Ecology of Commanster

Limoniidae